Residency Unlimited is an international artist's residency program in New York City, located within the former South Congregational Church in Carroll Gardens, in Brooklyn, New York. In addition to artist-in-residence programs, Residency Unlimited also hosts temporary exhibitions and commissions and public programs which are free and open to the public.

Notable alumni: Lauren Berkowitz, Isabelle Le Normand, Avi Lubin, Maayan Sheleff, Hyon Gyon, Taro Masushio, Fatma Shanan, Tuguldur Yondonjamts, Regina Parra

Sources 

Are You an Emerging Artist Looking to Raise Your Game? Here Are 7 Residencies That Can Help, Artnet Brian Boucher & Caroline Goldstein, July 27, 2017
THE END OF THE GRAND TOUR? VIRTUAL SYMPOSIUM ON ARTIST RESIDENCIES: FUTURE, PLACE AND STATe, Francisco Guevara,2020
Conceptualising the value of artist residencies: A research agenda, K Lehman - Cultural Management: Science and Education, 2017
How an art residency program is fueling the creative Saudi spirit, Ruba Obaid, Arab News
Art/Work - Revised & Updated: Everything You Need to Know (and Do) As You Pursue Your Art Career, Heather Darcy Bhandari, Jonathan Melber

References

External links 

 official website

Arts organizations established in 2009
Artist residencies
Contemporary art organizations
Art museums established in 2009
Art museums and galleries in New York City
2009 establishments in New York City